Pablo Andrés Vranjicán Storani (born 11 December 1985) is an Argentine footballer. His last club was Deportes La Serena.

Vranjicán also holds a Croatian passport due to his Croatian ancestry.

Club career
On 29 June 2013, he signed a contract with Cypriot side AEK Kouklia.

He made his first appearance with Pahang FC on 12 July 2016 against Kelantan as substitute and scored 2 goals in the match against Sarawak.

Honours

Club
Universidad Católica
 Primera División de Chile (1): 2010

References

External links
 
 Argentine Primera statistics at Fútbol XXI 

1984 births
Living people
Argentine footballers
Argentine expatriate footballers
People from Rosario Department
Chilean Primera División players
Cypriot First Division players
North American Soccer League players
Categoría Primera A players
Club Guaraní players
Newell's Old Boys footballers
Rangers de Talca footballers
Deportes La Serena footballers
Unión San Felipe footballers
Santiago Morning footballers
Club Deportivo Universidad Católica footballers
AEK Kouklia F.C. players
New York Cosmos (2010) players
Alianza Petrolera players
Expatriate footballers in Chile
Expatriate footballers in Paraguay
Expatriate footballers in Cyprus
Expatriate soccer players in the United States
Argentine people of Croatian descent
Association football forwards
Sportspeople from Santa Fe Province